Clintonite is a calcium magnesium aluminium phyllosilicate mineral. It is a member of the margarite group of micas and the subgroup often referred to as the "brittle" micas. Clintonite has the chemical formula. Like other micas and chlorites, clintonite is monoclinic in crystal form and has a perfect basal cleavage parallel to the flat surface of the plates or scales. The Mohs hardness of clintonite is 6.5, and the specific gravity is 3.0 to 3.1. It occurs as variably colored, colorless, green, yellow, red, to reddish-brown masses and radial clusters.

The brittle micas differ chemically from the micas in containing less silica and no alkalis, and from the chlorites in containing much less water; in many respects, they are intermediate between the micas and chlorites. Clintonite and its iron-rich variety xanthophyllite are sometimes considered the calcium analogues of the phlogopites.

Typical formation environment is in serpentinized Dolomitic limestone and contact metamorphosed skarns. It occurs with talc, spinel, grossular, vesuvianite, clinopyroxene, monticellite, chondrodite, phlogopite, chlorite, quartz, calcite and dolomite.

Clintonite was first described in 1843 for an occurrence in Orange County, New York. It was named for De Witt Clinton (1769–1828).

See also
List of minerals
List of minerals named after people

References

Phyllosilicates
Magnesium minerals
Calcium minerals
Aluminium minerals
Monoclinic minerals
Minerals in space group 12
Mica group